Vincente Fortunato is fictional character appearing in American comic books published by Marvel Comics. An elderly crime boss affiliated with the Maggia and HYDRA, he is usually depicted as an enemy of the superhero Spider-Man, and a competitor to the Kingpin.

Publication history
The character first appeared in Spider-Man #70 (July 1996), and was created by Howard Mackie and John Romita Jr.

Fictional character biography
When the Kingpin (Wilson Fisk) was absent from New York for a long period of time, Fortunato stepped into the power vacuum by using his ties with HYDRA, forcing the other crime lords, such as the Slug and Hammerhead, into accepting him. His elder son Giachomo "Jimmy-6" Fortunato is present at the meeting where Fortunato portrays his power. The Don brings out Tombstone to be executed. Then he brings out random civilians from each of the crime lord's territories. The plan is to have each crime lord kill a civilian, showcasing how Fortunato would punish disobedience by civilian massacres.

The horrified Jimmy-6 pulls a gun on his father in front of the crowd of people. The spectators do not intervene, wishing to see how Fortunato would handle this, but the second Spider-Man intervenes and is soon joined by Daredevil. The innocent civilians are freed but they and the heroes are cornered, pursued by various members of the meeting. Jimmy-6 shows up in an attack helicopter, killing the pursuers and rescuing the civilians and the superheroes. Jimmy eventually reconciles with his father, but extends his debt to Ben Reilly to Peter Parker.

Fortunato's dominance was eventually shattered when the Kingpin returned, launching a massed simultaneous attack on New York's crime lords and taking command during the confusion. Nitro attacks Fortunato on the Kingpin's orders, leaving him comatose. Jimmy-6 was seen leading his organization for several months afterward. Later, the elderly Fortunato re-emerged and bought the Venom Symbiote at an auction for his awkward younger son Angelo Fortunato who attempts to kill the original Spider-Man, but the Venom symbiote rejects Angelo as unworthy and allowed to fall to death. It was also confirmed that Jimmy-6 had somehow made peace with his father, as Fortunato briefly referred to as "My Beautiful Giacomo", showing no signs of ill will.

References

External links
Don Fortunato on the Marvel Wiki

Characters created by John Romita Jr.
Characters created by Howard Mackie
Comics characters introduced in 1996
Fictional crime bosses
Fictional Italian American people
Fictional gangsters
Marvel Comics supervillains
Spider-Man characters